Thomas Horschel (born 13 December 1960) is a German former wrestler. He competed in the men's Greco-Roman 90 kg at the 1980 Summer Olympics.

References

External links
 

1960 births
Living people
German male sport wrestlers
Olympic wrestlers of East Germany
Wrestlers at the 1980 Summer Olympics
People from Suhl
Universiade silver medalists for East Germany
Universiade medalists in wrestling
Medalists at the 1981 Summer Universiade
Sportspeople from Thuringia
20th-century German people
21st-century German people